3/4 Lonely is the sixth studio album by American country music artist T. G. Sheppard. It was released in 1979 via Warner Bros. and Curb Records. The includes the singles "You Feel Good All Over", "Last Cheater's Waltz" and "I'll Be Coming Back for More".

Track listing

Chart performance

References

1979 albums
T. G. Sheppard albums
Warner Records albums
Curb Records albums